The Pakistan Navy Ship Shifa or PNS Shifa is a Pakistan Navy-operated hospital located in Karachi, Sindh Province.

History
The hospital was established in 1953. It was a 600-bed hospital in 2006.

PNS Shifa is an accredited hospital by the College of Physicians and Surgeons of Pakistan.

See also
 List of hospitals in Karachi

References

External links 

Hospitals in Karachi
Pakistan Navy facilities
Military medical facilities in Pakistan
Hospitals established in 1953